James Edward Mentis (December 25, 1925 – December 24, 2012) was an American football and wrestling and coach. He served as the head football coach at Southwest Missouri State University–now known as Missouri State University–from 1965 to 1968, compiling a record of 20–21. Mentis was also the school's wrestling coach from 1961 to 1962.

Head coaching record

College football

References

External links
 

1925 births
2012 deaths
American football ends
American football tackles
Missouri State Bears football coaches
Missouri State Bears football players
College wrestling coaches in the United States
High school football coaches in Missouri
People from Mount Vernon, Ohio
Players of American football from Ohio